Madina Mosque is a mosque in Preston, Lancashire, England.

Buildings and structures in Preston
Mosques in England
Religious buildings and structures in Lancashire